The paddlenose chimaera or paddlenose spookfish (Rhinochimaera africana) is a species of fish in the family Rhinochimaeridae found near China, Japan, Mozambique, South Africa, and Taiwan. Its natural habitat is open seas. It is threatened by habitat loss.

References

Rhinochimaera
Taxonomy articles created by Polbot
Fish described in 1990